David Semel Rose (born June 12, 1957) is an American serial entrepreneur and angel investor. He is an investor in startup technology companies and founder of New York Angels, an early-stage technology investment group. He is Managing Partner of Rose Tech Ventures, a venture fund focused on Internet-based business, and CEO of Gust (formerly known as AngelSoft), which operates a collaboration platform for early stage angel investing.

Early life and education
Rose is the son of Joanna (née Semel) and Daniel Rose. Rose attended New York City public schools and Horace Mann High School. He received his BA in Urban Affairs from Yale University in 1979, his MBA in Finance from Columbia Business School in 1983 and an honorary Doctor of Engineering degree from Stevens Institute of Technology.

Career
Rose was involved in the early development of the Silicon Alley technology community in New York, including working with pre-Internet era online data services and founding Ex Machina, a computer software company; The Computer Classroom, an early personal computer training company; and AirMedia, an early wireless Internet information network.

Rose founded and runs a technology incubator in New York City and is a founding member of the Space Angels Network, an international investing group. In 2005, BusinessWeek magazine included an article titled 'The Pitch Coach' about his  sessions for entrepreneurs seeking funding from venture capitalists and angel investors. He is an Associate Founder of Singularity University, the post-graduate program in accelerating technologies, and founded and chaired its Finance, Entrepreneurship and Economics track.

In 2014, Rose wrote the New York Times best-selling book "Angel Investing: The Gust Guide to Making Money & Having Fun Investing in Startups", to give guidance to investors considering investments in startups.

Personal life
In 1982, he married Gail Ruth Gremse. They have three children.

References

External links
 
 

1957 births
Living people
American computer businesspeople
20th-century American Jews
Businesspeople in software
Angel investors
Columbia Business School alumni
Horace Mann School alumni
Stevens Institute of Technology alumni
Yale University alumni
American chief executives
Rose family
21st-century American Jews